Giovanni Virginio Schiaparelli  (also  , ; 14 March 1835 – 4 July 1910) was an Italian astronomer and science historian.

Biography 

He studied at the University of Turin, graduating in 1854, and later did research at Berlin Observatory, under Encke. In 1859–1860 he worked in Pulkovo Observatory near St Petersburg, and then worked for over forty years at Brera Observatory in Milan. He was also a senator of the Kingdom of Italy, a member of the Accademia dei Lincei, the Accademia delle Scienze di Torino and the Regio Istituto Lombardo, and is particularly known for his studies of Mars.

Mars 

Among Schiaparelli's contributions are his telescopic observations of Mars. In his initial observations, he named the "seas" and "continents" of Mars. During the planet's "great opposition" of 1877, he observed a dense network of linear structures on the surface of Mars, which he called  in Italian, meaning "channels", but the term was mistranslated into English as "canals".

While the term "canals" indicates an artificial construction, the term "channels" connotes that the observed features were natural configurations of the planetary surface. From the incorrect translation into the term "canals", various assumptions were made about life on Mars; as these assumptions were popularized, the "canals" of Mars became famous, giving rise to waves of hypotheses, speculation, and folklore about the possibility of intelligent life on Mars, the Martians. Among the most fervent supporters of the artificial-canal hypothesis was the American astronomer Percival Lowell, who spent much of his life trying to prove the existence of intelligent life on the red planet. After Lowell's death in 1916, astronomers developed a consensus against the canal hypothesis, but the popular concept of Martian canals excavated by intelligent Martians remained in the public mind for the first half of the 20th century and inspired a corpus of works of classic science fiction.

Later, with notable thanks to the observations of the Italian astronomer Vincenzo Cerulli, scientists came to the conclusion that the famous channels were actually mere optical illusions. The last popular speculations about canals were finally put to rest during the spaceflight era beginning in the 1960s, when visiting spacecraft such as Mariner 4 photographed the surface with much higher resolution than Earth-based telescopes, confirming that there are no structures resembling "canals".

In his book Life on Mars, Schiaparelli wrote: "Rather than true channels in a form familiar to us, we must imagine depressions in the soil that are not very deep, extended in a straight direction for thousands of miles, over a width of 100, 200 kilometers and maybe more. I have already pointed out that, in the absence of rain on Mars, these channels are probably the main mechanism by which the water (and with it organic life) can spread on the dry surface of the planet."

Astronomy and history of science 

An observer of objects in the Solar System, Schiaparelli worked on binary stars, discovered the large main-belt asteroid 69 Hesperia on 29 April 1861, and demonstrated that the meteor showers were associated with comets. He proved, for example, that the orbit of the Leonid meteor shower coincided with that of the comet Tempel-Tuttle. These observations led the astronomer to formulate the hypothesis, subsequently proved to be correct, that the meteor showers could be the trails of comets. He was also a keen observer of the inner planets Mercury and Venus.  He made several drawings and determined their rotation periods.  In 1965, it was shown that his and most other subsequent measurements of Mercury's period were incorrect.

Schiaparelli was a scholar of the history of classical astronomy. He was the first to realize that the concentric spheres of Eudoxus of Cnidus and Callippus, unlike those used by many astronomers of later times, were not to be taken as material objects, but only as part of an algorithm similar to the modern Fourier series.

He was elected to the American Philosophical Society in 1901.

Honors and awards

Awards 
 Lalande Prize (1868)
 Gold Medal of the Royal Astronomical Society (1872)
 Bruce Medal (1902)

Named after him
 The main-belt asteroid 4062 Schiaparelli, named on 15 September 1989.
 The lunar crater Schiaparelli
 The Martian crater Schiaparelli
 Schiaparelli Dorsum on Mercury
 The 2016 ExoMars' Schiaparelli lander.

Relatives 

His niece, Elsa Schiaparelli, became a noted designer or maker of haute couture.

Selected writings 
 
 1873 – Le stelle cadenti (The Falling Stars)
 
 
 1893 – La vita sul pianeta Marte (Life on Mars)
 1925 – Scritti sulla storia della astronomia antica (Writings on the History of Classical Astronomy) in three volumes. Bologna. Reprint: Milano, Mimesis, 1997.

References

Further reading
 
 "Schiaparelli, Giovanni Virginio (1835–1910)", biography from www.daviddarling.info.
 Obituaries: G. V. Schiaparelli, J. G. Galle, J. B. N. Hennessey J. Coles, J. E. Gore, The Observatory, Vol. 33, p. 311–318, August 1910

External links

 
 Le Mani su Marte: I diari di G.V. Schiaparelli. Observational diaries, manuscripts & drawings. Historical Archive of Brera Observatory.

Obituaries
 AN 185 (1910) 193/194 
 ApJ 32 (1910) 313
 MNRAS 71 (1911) 282
 PASP 22 (1910) 164

1835 births
1910 deaths
Discoverers of asteroids
Foreign Members of the Royal Society
Corresponding members of the Saint Petersburg Academy of Sciences
Honorary members of the Saint Petersburg Academy of Sciences
Foreign associates of the National Academy of Sciences
19th-century Italian astronomers
People from Savigliano
Recipients of the Bruce Medal
Recipients of the Gold Medal of the Royal Astronomical Society
Recipients of the Pour le Mérite (civil class)
Members of the Senate of the Kingdom of Italy
University of Turin alumni
Recipients of the Lalande Prize